Xiulin may refer to the following places:

Xiulin, Hebei, a town in Jingxing County, Shijiazhuang, Hebei, China
Xiulin, Hualien, a township in Hualien County, Taiwan